Ponthirwaun is a hamlet in the  community of Beulah, Ceredigion, Wales, which is 71.3 miles (114.8 km) from Cardiff and 192.5 miles (309.7 km) from London. Ponthirwaun is represented in the Senedd by Elin Jones (Plaid Cymru) and is part of the Ceredigion constituency in the House of Commons.

See also
List of localities in Wales by population

References

External links 
Ceredigion County Council article on Ponthirwaun

Villages in Ceredigion